Basananthe is a genus of flowering plants belonging to the family Passifloraceae.

Its native range is dry Tropical Africa.

Species:

Basananthe aciphylla 
Basananthe apetala 
Basananthe aristolochioides 
Basananthe baumii 
Basananthe berberoides 
Basananthe botryoidea 
Basananthe cupricola 
Basananthe gossweileri 
Basananthe hanningtoniana 
Basananthe hederae 
Basananthe heterophylla 
Basananthe hispidula 
Basananthe holmesii 
Basananthe kisimbae 
Basananthe kottoensis 
Basananthe kundelunguensis 
Basananthe lanceolata 
Basananthe littoralis 
Basananthe longifolia 
Basananthe malaissei 
Basananthe merolae 
Basananthe nummularia 
Basananthe papillosa 
Basananthe parvifolia 
Basananthe pedata 
Basananthe phaulantha 
Basananthe polygaloides 
Basananthe pseudostipulata 
Basananthe pubiflora 
Basananthe reticulata 
Basananthe sandersonii 
Basananthe scabrida 
Basananthe scabrifolia 
Basananthe spinosa 
Basananthe subsessilicarpa 
Basananthe triloba 
Basananthe zanzibarica

References

Passifloraceae
Malpighiales genera
Taxa named by Johann Joseph Peyritsch